Sean Lester Rooks (September 9, 1969 – June 7, 2016) was an American professional basketball player. He played in the National Basketball Association (NBA) from 1992 to 2004, and was an Assistant for Player Development for the Philadelphia 76ers. He played college basketball for the Arizona Wildcats, earning all-conference honors in the Pac-10 (known later as the Pac-12) as a senior.  Rooks died of heart disease on June 7, 2016.

Early life
Rooks was born in New York, New York and attended Fontana High School in Fontana, California. He played college basketball at the University of Arizona with Brian Williams and Ed Stokes. Rooks was an All-American honorable mention.

Playing career
The 6'10" center was drafted by the Dallas Mavericks in the second round (30th overall pick) in the 1992 NBA Draft. He was a starter for the Mavericks in his rookie season and then again in 1995 for the Minnesota Timberwolves. He also played for the Atlanta Hawks, the Los Angeles Lakers, the Los Angeles Clippers, the New Orleans Hornets, and the Orlando Magic. Rooks played twelve seasons in the NBA between 1992 and 2004.

Coaching career
After retiring, Rooks moved into coaching and served as an assistant coach in the NBA Development League for the Bakersfield Jam (2007–2008), the New Mexico Thunderbirds (2010–2011) and the Sioux Falls Skyforce (from March 2012). In 2012, he joined the Phoenix Suns' player development staff. He resigned from the staff in January 2013 to taking a coaching position overseas. From 2014 until his death, he was an assistant coach for the Philadelphia 76ers.

Personal life
Rooks had 2 children, a daughter Khayla who played for the Washington Huskies women's basketball team, and a son, Kameron, who was a member of the 2013–14 California Golden Bears men's basketball team recruiting class at the University of California, Berkeley.

Death
Rooks died of heart disease in Philadelphia on June 7, 2016, hours after interviewing for a job on the New York Knicks coaching staff.

References

External links

 One-on-One with Sean Rooks

1969 births
2016 deaths
American color commentators
American expatriate basketball people in Spain
American men's basketball coaches
American men's basketball players
Arizona Wildcats men's basketball players
Atlanta Hawks players
Bakersfield Jam coaches
Basketball coaches from California
Basketball players from California
Basketball coaches from New York (state)
Basketball players from New York City
Baloncesto Málaga players
Centers (basketball)
Dallas Mavericks draft picks
Dallas Mavericks players
Joventut Badalona players
Liga ACB players
Los Angeles Clippers players
Los Angeles Lakers players
Minnesota Timberwolves players
New Mexico Thunderbirds coaches
New Orleans Hornets players
Orlando Magic players
People from Fontana, California
Philadelphia 76ers assistant coaches
Phoenix Suns assistant coaches
Sioux Falls Skyforce coaches
Sportspeople from San Bernardino County, California